Augusto Dinis is a former Portuguese footballer who played as a half-back.

He mostly known for his four-year spell at Benfica, where he won two major honours.

Career
Dinis arrived at Benfica in 1929, but only made his debut on 14 May 1930, against Carcavelinhos, on the path to the Campeonato de Portugal win. In the following season, he partnered with Vítor Silva and Manuel de Oliveira at the front, helping Benfica retain the Campeonato de Portugal title, appearing in 15 games and scoring four goals.

A year later, Dinis helped Benfica reach the semi-finals of the Campeonato de Portugal. He played 12 games in 1932–33, 10 in the Campeonato de Lisboa, scoring twice, as Benfica won a competition. His last game was on 18 May 1933, opening the score in the Lisbon Championship final with Beleneses.

Honours
Benfica
Campeonato de Portugal: 1929–30, 1930–31
Campeonato de Lisboa: 1932–33

References
General
 

Specific

Year of birth missing
Year of death missing
Portuguese footballers
Association football midfielders
S.L. Benfica footballers